The Ghost of Paul Revere are an American folk trio from Portland, Maine composed of Max Davis, Sean McCarthy and Griffin Sherry. The band made their national debut when they appeared as the musical guest on the TBS talk show, Conan, in January of 2018.

In late 2017 and continuing through to their 2018 tour, the band was joined by pianist and accordionist Ben Cosgrove to make a quartet.

On June 7, 2019 The Ghost of Paul Revere song "Ballad of the 20th Maine" became the official state ballad of Maine. The song, written by Griffin Sherry, commemorates the 20th Maine Volunteer Infantry Regiment.

On April 18, 2022, in an Instagram post, the trio announced they will be disbanding following the Ghostland Festival.

Members 
 Max Davis - vocalist, banjo 
 Sean McCarthy - vocalist, bass
 Griffin Sherry - vocalist, guitar
 Charles “Chuck” Gagne - drums

Discography 

Studio Albums
 Goodbye (2022)
 Good at Losing Everything (2020)
 Monarch (2017)
 Believe (2014)

Live Albums
 Audiotree Live (2015)
 The Sumner Knight Series (2015)

EPs
 Field Notes, Vol. 3 (2021)
 Ghost Notes (2020)
 Field Notes, Vol. 2 (2019)
 Field Notes, Vol. 1 (2015)
 North (2012)

Singles
 Wolves b/w Ghostland (2019)

References

External links
 Official website

Musical groups from Maine
Musical groups from Portland, Maine
Musical groups established in 2011
Musical groups disestablished in 2022
Musicians from Portland, Maine
American folk rock groups
2011 establishments in Maine
2022 disestablishments in Maine